Tortelier is a surname. Notable people with the surname include:

 Paul Tortelier (1914–1990), French cellist and composer
 Yan Pascal Tortelier (born 1947), French conductor and violinist, son of Paul